Located in the Yawal Tehsil of the Jalgaon district of Maharashtra, India, Yawal Wildlife Sanctuary is spread over an area of approximately  covered by dense forest. It is situated at the banks of the Anner and Manjar rivers and at the border of Madhya Pradesh, with a notably diverse natural community.  

Excessive deforestation and tree smuggling have led to serious habitat degradation at the beginning of this century. The local government, indigenous groups, and several environmental organizations have worked to reverse the damage. Organizations such as Lok Sangharsh Morcha (LSM) or the People’s Struggle Front have worked to ensure conservation of the region. The sanctuary is gradually recovering.

Sanctuary Attractions 
The Yawal Wildlife Sanctuary is home to many animals, most notably the Bengal tiger. Other animals include blue bulls, wild dogs, flying squirrels, and leopards. Additional attractions include the temples of Sri Padmalaya, the Swinging Towers of Farkande, and Unapdev Hot Springs.

Wildlife

Flora
Teak, Salai, and Anjan trees dominate the forest. Other common plant species include Shisam, Haldu, Jamun, Tendu, Awala, bamboo and  other long grasses.

Fauna
The sanctuary is home to lots of fauna including tigers, leopards, sambar deer, chinkara, nilgai, sloth bears, jackals, foxes, wolves, wild boars, barking deer, jungle cats, palm civet, wild dogs, and flying squirrels.

Climate 
Heavy rainfall is present, particularly from June to September, often reducing visitation from tourists. The most popular time to visit is it's Winter, with a temperature range of 20-28°C it is far milder than its typical scorching summers (with the potential to pass 35°C).

Accommodation
The Government rest house provides facilities for lodging and boarding, while the British period rest house is located in Pal, which is located in the Sanctuary.

Transportation
Jalgaon Airport is the nearest airport to the sanctuary, while the nearest railway station is Bhuswal Junction.

References

External links
 http://www.amazingmaharashtra.com/2013/02/yawal-wildlife-sanctuary.html
 http://www.CarDekho.com/features-stories/a-jungle-trail-drive-to-yawal-wildlife-sanctuary-in-nissan-xtrail.htm

Wildlife sanctuaries in Maharashtra
Protected areas of Maharashtra
Tourist attractions in Jalgaon district
Protected areas with year of establishment missing